Unwarranted variation (or geographic variation) in health care service delivery refers to medical practice pattern variation that cannot be explained by illness, medical need, or the dictates of evidence-based medicine. It is one of the causes of low value care often ignored by health systems.

Definition
Unwarranted variation (or geographic variation) in health care service delivery refers to differences that cannot be explained by personal preference, illness, medical need, or the dictates of evidence-based medicine. The term was coined by Dr. John Wennberg.
Unwarranted variation reveals three areas:

 Overuse of treatments (or overutilisation) such that more harm than good is being done 
Underuse of treatments such that cost-effective interventions are not being provided 
Inequity of care (a subset of underuse) such that parts of the population are not accessing treatment, possibly because of their social background.

Supply-sensitive care, which is strongly correlated with healthcare system resource capacity and generally provided in the absence of medical evidence and clinical theory. It also drives inequity as those from poorer backgrounds are often less profitable, or have more complex needs.

History
In 1938, in the Journal of the Royal Society of Medicine J Alison Glover published a paper showing unexplained variations in tonsillectomy rates across British School Districts. In 1967, John (Jack) Wennberg analyzed Medicare data to determine how well hospitals and doctors were serving their communities. He found 4 types of variation: the underuse of effective care, variations in outcomes attributable to the quality of care, the misuse of preference-sensitive treatments and overuse of supply-sensitive services.

According to Health Dialog, a privately held, for-profit disease-management company which was established to address unwarranted variation:

Extent
Unwarranted variation in medical practice is costly and deadly as noted by Martin Sipkoff in 9 Ways To Reduce Unwarranted Variation. Analysis of Medicare data revealed that per-capita spending per enrollee in Miami was almost 2.5 times as much as in Minneapolis, even after adjusting data for age, sex, and race. According to a 2003 report from the National Committee for Quality Assurance 57,000 people died annually because US physicians have not been using evidence-based medicine to guide their care.

"We're literally dying, waiting for the practice of medicine to catch up with medical knowledge," said Margaret O'Kane, president of NCQA. The report, "The State of Health Care Quality 2003," says that the deaths "should not be confused with those attributable to medical errors or lack of access to health care. This report shows that a thousand Americans die each week because the care they get is not consistent with the care that medical science tells us they should get."

United States
Studies show that individuals with diabetes should have blood lipids monitored regularly, yet patients in Chicago are 50% less likely to receive these tests than patients in Fort Lauderdale. A patient with heart disease in Bloomington, Indiana, is three times more likely to have bypass surgery than a similar patient in Albuquerque. In Miami, where medical services are abundant, Medicare pays more than twice as much per person per year as it does in Minneapolis, with no discernible difference in overall health or life expectancy.

NHS England
In November 2010 the Department of Health QIPP Right Care programme published the first NHS Atlas of Variation in Healthcare, inspired by the work of Wennberg. Clinicians selected 34 topics,  as being important to their speciality, which were mapped by primary care trust area, then the healthcare commissioning body. The Atlas was published to challenge commissioners to maximise health outcome and minimise inequalities by addressing unwarranted variation:

The 2010 atlas revealed widespread variations in outcome, quality, cost and activity:
 A twofold variation among strategic health authorities in the incidence of major amputations per 1000 patients with registered Type 2 diabetes and a fivefold variation in the percentage of people with diabetes receiving the NICE recommended nine key care processes
 A fourfold variation in directly standardised rate of elective admissions in persons diagnosed with epilepsy per 100,000 population
 A threefold variation in the percentage of patients admitted to hospital who spend 90% of their time on a stroke unit
 A fourfold variation in emergency asthma admissions for children and young adults
 A sixfold variation in provision of hip replacement per 1,000 people in need
 A twofold variation in cancer inpatient expenditure per 1,000 population

A further extended Atlas was published in November 2011, mapping variation across 71 indicators and a follow-on series of Atlases focussing on specific themes in more depth like children and young people, diabetes, kidney disease and respiratory disease. A forthcoming atlas will be about liver disease, diagnostics, organ donation and transplantation. Publication of the atlases has been well-received within the NHS and by patient groups and clinical societies.
 
In 2012, the Department of Health published a mandate for the new NHS Commissioning Board. On variation in healthcare, the mandate charged the board with the responsibility to "shine a light on variation" and "to make significant progress... in reducing unjustified variation... Success will be measured not only by the average level of improvement but also by progress in reducing health inequalities and unjustified variation."

COVID-19 rates were found to be associated with unwarranted variations too. In a study published in 2022 in British Journal of Healthcare Management, a significant association between long unemployment and likelihood of death from COVID-19 was found in England. Areas with higher proportions of individuals from Black, Asian and ethnic minority backgrounds were also more likely to have higher rates of hospitalisations and deaths from COVID-19.

Nursing, midwifery and care staff framework, England
In April 2016, Jane Cummings, Chief Nursing Officer (CNO) for England, launched a national strategic framework for nurses, midwives and care staff in England called Leading Change, Adding Value. This framework sets out the 10 commitments for nurses, midwives and care staff in England towards identifying and addressing unwarranted variation in care practice. The framework builds on the previous CNO strategy 'Compassion in Practice' and identifies the nursing, midwifery and care staff approach to meeting the triple aims of 'improving health outcomes, reducing the care quality gap and effective use of resources' as set out in the Department of Health's Five Year Forward View. Actions to address unwarranted variation in nursing, midwifery and care provision are underpinned by the values of the 6cs, and a skills and knowledge framework is being developed to support staff in delivering on the 10 commitments set out in the framework.

See also
Overutilization

References

External links
Presentation on unwarranted Variation dhslides.org Dr. John Wennberg 
 The complete Right Care Atlas series is available as PDF downloads and as interactive InstantAtlas(tm) version on Right Care
 Phil DaSilva, Joint National Lead for Right Care, in conversation with Jack Wennberg on the NHS Atlas
 Right Care Essential Reading List: Unwarranted variation in health care - with an introduction by Sir Muir Gray September 2011
 leading Change, Adding value: A framework for nursing, midwifery and care staff 
 Compassion in Practice: Nursing, Midwifery and Care staff - our vision and strategy 
 Five Year Forward View, NHS

News publications
 The High Cost of Health Care, The New York Times Editorial, Nov. 25, 2007
 State of the Nation's Health, Maggie Mahar, Dartmouth Medicine, Spring 2007
 Medical Guesswork: From heart surgery to prostate care, the medical industry knows little about which treatments really work, John Carey, Business Week, May 29, 2006
 Less care could help chronically ill, study says, Mary Jo Feldstein, St. Louis Post Dispatch, May 16, 2006
 Back pain is behind a debate, Julie Appleby, USA Today, October 17, 2006
  Clamping down on variation, Michael T. McCue, Managed Healthcare Executive, Feb 1, 2003
 Care Varies Widely At Top Medical Centers: Study Finds NYU, UCLA Used More Services Vs. Mayo, UC-San Francisco for Similar Patients, RON WINSLOW, Wall Street Journal, May 16, 2006

Academic publications
 Fisher, E.S. et al., Variations in the Longitudinal Efficiency of AcademicMedical Centers, Health Affairs, 7 October 2004
 Modifying Unwarranted Variations In Health Care: Shared Decision Making Using Patient Decision Aids: A review of the evidence base for shared decision making, O'Connor, AM et al., Health Affairs, 7 October 2004
 Wennberg, JE et al., Use Of Medicare Claims Data To Monitor Provider-Specific Performance Among Patients With Severe Chronic Illness: Analyses of seventy-seven of America's "best hospitals" document extensive variation in the amount of care provided to patients with three common chronic conditions, Health Affairs, Oct. 7, 2004.
 Fisher, ES et al., The Implications of Regional Variations in Medicare Spending.  Part 1: The Content, Quality, and Accessibility of Care, The Annals of Internal Medicine, 2003; 138: 273-287.
 Fisher, ES et al., The Implications of Regional Variations in Medicare Spending.  Part 2: Health Outcomes and Satisfaction with Care, The Annals of Internal Medicine, 2003; 138: 288-298.
 Wennberg, JE et al., Unwarranted variations in healthcare delivery: implications for academic medical centres, BMJ. 2002 October 26; 325(7370): 961–964.
 Wennberg, JE,  Geography and the Debate overMedicare Reform, J.E.Wennberg, E.S. Fisher, and J.S. Skinner, HealthAffairs, 13 February 2002.
 Wennberg, JE et al., Hospital use and mortality among Medicare beneficiaries in Boston and New Haven. N Engl J Med 1989;321:116873.
 Wennberg, JE at al., Are hospital services rationed in New Haven or overutilized in Boston?, Lancet 1987;i:11858.

Geodemography
Medical sociology
Health care quality
Unnecessary health care